Ibrickane (or Ibrickan) is one of the ancient baronies of Ireland.Placenames Database of Ireland - Barony of Ibrickane  It is a geographical division of County Clare. It is sub-divided into four civil parishes.

Legal context
Baronies were created after the Norman invasion of Ireland as divisions of counties and were used for the administration of justice and the raising of revenue. While baronies continue to be officially defined units, they have been administratively obsolete since 1898. However, they continue to be used in land registration and in specification, such as in planning permissions. In many cases, a barony corresponds to an earlier Gaelic túath which had submitted to the Crown.

Location
The barony of Ibrickane extends along the Atlantic coast of County Clare. It is bounded by the baronies of Corcomroe (to the north), Inchiquin (to the north-east), Islands (to the east), Clonderalaw (to the south-east) and by Moyarta (to the south-west).
The southern part is boggy, while the northern part holds farmland and moorish uplands.

Parishes and settlements

The barony contains the civil parishes of Kilfarboy, Killard and Kilmurry and part of the parish of Kilmacduane.
The main settlements are Milltown Malbay, Doonbeg, Kilmurry and Mullagh.

References
Citations

Sources

Baronies of County Clare